Martin Gilbert Zeno (born November 15, 1985) is an American professional basketball player.

Professional career

In the 2012-2013 season Zeno earned Korisliiga Most Valuable Player in Finland. Eurobasket.com All-Finnish Korisliiga

On February 23, 2016, Zeno signed with CSM Oradea of the Liga Națională. He won the 2015–16 Romanian championship with Oradea. Because Oradea won the Romanian championship, Zeno and the team played in the Basketball Champions League the following season. On January 19, 2017, Zeno was named BCL Game Day MVP after scoring 42 points for an efficiency rating of 40 in a win over Kataja.

On 19 December 2018, he has joined Hungarian club Alba Fehérvár.

References

1985 births
Living people
Alba Fehérvár players
American expatriate basketball people in Finland
American expatriate basketball people in France
American expatriate basketball people in Hungary
American expatriate basketball people in the Philippines
American expatriate basketball people in Romania
American men's basketball players
Basketball players from Louisiana
Bisons Loimaa players
CSM Oradea (basketball) players
Denain Voltaire Basket players
Erie BayHawks (2008–2017) players
Philippine Basketball Association imports
Powerade Tigers players
Shooting guards
Texas Tech Red Raiders basketball players